is a Japanese actor, TV personality, narrator, voice actor and presenter. He is currently employed by ComeCome Miniki-Na Theater Company and SIS company. He landed his first hosting job on the Fuji TV series Hey! Spring of Trivia, a show he co-hosted with fellow actor Katsumi Takahashi, and has also participated in a few anime productions, voicing characters such as Iwanbo in Rurouni Kenshin and Œufcoque in Mardock Scramble.

He is married to stage actress , and their first son was born on May 12, 2007.

Filmography

Film

Television

Anime
 Boys Over Flowers (1996) - Lighting Staff
 Rurouni Kenshin (1996) - Iwanbo, Kameo, et al
 Kero Kero Chime (1997) - Poppo, Frog C, Kabayan
 Hatsumei Boy Kanipan (1998) - Kanburi
 Mardock Scramble (2010-2012) - Œufcoque Penteano
 Rudolf the Black Cat (2016) - Buchi

Video games
 Kowloon's Gate (1996) - Mushroom Seller Charlie
 Ni no Kuni: Wrath of the White Witch (2010) - King Tom Tildrum XIV

Dubbing
 Open Season (2006) - Elliot
 The Good Dinosaur (2016) - Nash
 Dolittle (2020) - Plimpton

References

External links
  
  
 Norito Yashima on NHK Archives 
 

1970 births
Living people
People from Nara, Nara
Japanese male actors